Dragon Lady is a stereotype of certain East Asian and occasionally South Asian or Southeast Asian women as strong, deceitful, domineering, mysterious, and often sexually alluring. 

Dragon Lady may also refer to:

People
Devika Rani (1908–1994), Indian actress
Madame Nhu (1924–2011), First Lady of South Vietnam
Soong Mei-ling (1898–2003), First Lady of the Republic of China

Arts, entertainment and media
Dragon Lady (Terry and the Pirates), a character in the comic strip Terry and the Pirates
Dragon Lady (TV series), a 2019 Philippine television drama fansy series broadcast by GMA Network
Dragon Ladies: Asian American Feminists Breathe Fire, a 1997 book by Sonia Shah
The G.I. Executioner, a 1975 American action film

Business
Dragon Lady Comics, a Canadian comic book shop
Dragon Lady Press, a Canadian comic book publishing company

Other uses
Lockheed U-2, an American reconnaissance aircraft

See also
Lady Dragon, a 1990 American martial arts film